Lepidium nitidum, known by the common name shining  pepperweed, is a species of flowering plant in the mustard family.

It is native to far western North America from Washington, through Nevada and California, into Baja California. It thrives in diverse habitat types.

It may be found elsewhere as an introduced species.

Description
Lepidium nitidum is a mainly erect annual herb producing a slender stem up to about 40 centimeters tall. There are small leaves along the stem and larger ones at the base growing up to 10 centimeters long and divided into many narrow lobes.

At the top of the stem appear tiny flowers with spoon-shaped white petals only about a millimeter long.

The flowers give way to flattened, rounded to oval-shaped disclike fruits up to about half a centimeter long. Each green to pink shiny fruit is divided down the center into two chambers containing seeds.

External links
Jepson Manual Treatment of Lepidium nitidum
Lepidium nitidum — U.C. Photo gallery

nitidum
Flora of Baja California
Flora of California
Flora of Nevada
Flora of Oregon
Flora of Washington (state)
Flora of the California desert regions
Flora of the Cascade Range
Flora of the Great Basin
Flora of the Klamath Mountains
Flora of the Sierra Nevada (United States)
Flora of the Sonoran Deserts
Natural history of the California Coast Ranges
Natural history of the Central Valley (California)
Natural history of the Channel Islands of California
Natural history of the Colorado Desert
Natural history of the Mojave Desert
Natural history of the Peninsular Ranges
Natural history of the San Francisco Bay Area
Natural history of the Transverse Ranges
Plants described in 1838
Flora without expected TNC conservation status